Trichocereeae is a tribe of cactus that are particular to South America. There are 25 recognized genera in this tribe.

Description
Arborescent to shrubby, Trichocereeae normally form unsegmented, spherical to columnar stems that are usually ribbed, tuberculate, or ribbed-warty.

The small to fairly large, regular or bilaterally symmetrical flowers appear laterally or below the apex and open day or night. The flower cup is scaled or covered with hair.

The fruits are fleshy to berry-like and sometimes burst open lengthwise. They contain small to medium-sized seeds that vary in shape. Hilum and micropyle of seeds are fused to united. Appendages are usually absent. A strophic is present in some.

Genera
Acanthocalycium
Arthrocereus
Brachycereus
Cleistocactus
Denmoza
Discocactus
Echinopsis
Espostoa
Espostoopsis
Facheiroa
Gymnocalycium
Haageocereus
Harrisia
Leocereus
Matucana
Mila
Oreocereus
Oroya
Pygmaeocereus
Rauhocereus
Rebutia
Samaipaticereus
Soehrensia
Vatricania
Weberbauerocereus
Yungasocereus

Hybrids 
 × Haagespostoa [= Haageocereus × Espostoa]

References

External links 
 USDA, ARS, National Genetic Resources Program. Germplasm Resources Information Network - (GRIN). National Germplasm Resources Laboratory, Beltsville, Maryland, June 1, 2007.

 
Cacti of South America
Caryophyllales tribes